Parzinger is a surname of German origin. Notable people with the surname include:

 Hermann Parzinger (born 1959), German ancient historian
 Tommi Parzinger (1903–1981), German furniture designer and painter

See also
 

Surnames of German origin